Sabine Pauwels (born 1 December 1966) is a Belgian former backstroke, freestyle and medley swimmer. She competed in three events at the 1984 Summer Olympics.

References

External links
 

1966 births
Living people
Belgian female backstroke swimmers
Belgian female freestyle swimmers
Belgian female medley swimmers
Olympic swimmers of Belgium
Swimmers at the 1984 Summer Olympics
People from Hamme
Sportspeople from East Flanders
20th-century Belgian women